Hance is an English and French surname. Notable people with the surname include:

Benjamin Hance (born 2000), Australian Paralympic swimmer
Blake Hance (born 1996), American football player
Guy Hance (1933–2008), Belgian politician
Henry Fletcher Hance (1827–1886), British diplomat and botanist
Kent Hance (born 1942), American academic administrator
Rei Hance (born 1974 as Heather Donahue), American actress and writer
William Henry Hance (1951–1994), American soldier and serial killer

English-language surnames
French-language surnames